Lower Newport is an unincorporated community in Washington County, in the U.S. state of Ohio.

History
Lower Newport was originally called the "Lower Settlement" in contrast to the "Upper Settlement", i.e. Newport. Lower Newport was a major shipping point for riverboats. A post office called Lower Newport was in operation from 1842 until 1904.

References

Unincorporated communities in Washington County, Ohio
Unincorporated communities in Ohio